Gustavo Guazzelli Bonatto also known as Gustavão (born ) is a Brazilian male volleyball player. He was part of the Brazil men's national volleyball team from 2010 to 2014. On club level, he currently plays for Greek powerhouse Olympiacos Piraeus, being an integral part of the Olympiacos team that won the 2022–23 CEV Challenge Cup.
.

Honours

Clubs
CEV Challenge Cup
  2022/2023 – with Olympiacos Piraeus

South American Championship 
  2016 – with UPCN

National Championships
2003/2004  Liga Nacional with UCS Sogipa
2007/2008  Catarinense Championship with Unisul
2009/2010   Paulista Championship with SESI São Paulo
2016/2017    Argentine Super Cup with UPCN
2018/2019   Brazilian Super Cup with SESI São Paulo

Individually
 2009 Brazilian Championship – Best Blocker
 2010 Pan-American Cup – Best Blocker
 2012 Brazilian Championship – Best Blocker
 2014 Brazilian Championship – Best Blocker
 2017 Argentine Championship – Best Middle Blocker 
 2022 CEV Champions League  – Best Middle Blocker

References

External links
 profile at FIVB.org
 profile at Volleybox
 profile at Globalsportsarchive

1986 births
Living people
Olympiacos S.C. players
Brazilian volleyball players
Brazilian men's volleyball players
Place of birth missing (living people)